The 2012 Premier Bank Bangladesh Championship League started in March 2012 where 7 clubs competed with each other on double-league basis.

Teams and locations

 Agrani Bank SC, Dhaka
 Beanibazar SC, Sylhet
 Chittagong Abahani, Chittagong
 Coxcity SC, Cox's Bazar
 Uttar Baridhara SC, Dhaka
 Victoria SC, Dhaka
 Wari Club, Dhaka

The venues were-
 Bir Sherestha Shaheed Shipahi Mostafa Kamal Stadium, Dhaka
 Cox’s Bazar Stadium, Cox's Bazar
 MA Aziz Stadium, Chittagong
 Sylhet District Stadium, Sylhet

Standings

References

2012
2
Bangladesh
Bangladesh